Chamua is a village located in West Champaran district of Bihar state, India. The village is 7 km from Narkatiaganj and Ramnagar (Harinagar). Chamua has its own Gram Panchayat, a primary school, a high school, a primary health centre. As per the Census of India 2011, Chamua has a population of 2494 persons with 1281 male and 1213 female.

Transport
Chamua railway station is situated on Muzaffarpur–Gorakhpur main line under the Samastipur railway division of East Central Railway zone. This village falls under Narkatiyaganj Sub Division.

References

Villages in West Champaran district